Lianzhou is a town of Doumen District, Zhuhai, Guangdong, China. , it has 3 residential communities and 27 villages under its administration.

References

Township-level divisions of Guangdong
Zhuhai